Natalia Vladimirovna Egorova (née Bykova, born 13 September 1966) is a retired professional tennis player who represented the Soviet Union and Russia.

Egorova won two doubles titles on the WTA Tour as well as two singles and 27 doubles titles on the ITF Women's Circuit. On 27 February 1989, she reached her best singles ranking of world number 76. On 9 May 1988, she peaked at number 26 in the WTA doubles rankings.

Playing for Soviet Union at the Fed Cup, Egorova has accumulated a win–loss record of 6–2.

Egorova retired from tennis in 2003.

WTA career finals

Doubles: 3 (2 titles, 1 runner-up)

ITF finals

Singles (2–4)

Doubles (27–13)

Other finals

Singles (0–2)

Doubles (1–4)

Mixed (0–2)

References

External links
 
 
 

Living people
1966 births
Russian female tennis players
Soviet female tennis players